These are the longest-running radio programmes – those which were broadcast regularly for many decades.

Pilots, special broadcasts and repeats after the continuous run are not counted in the primary statistic.  Title changes are acceptable if the format and presentation is otherwise continuous.

List

See also

Lists of longest-running shows internationally:
 List of longest-running television shows by category
 List of longest-running Australian television series
 List of longest-running Indian television series
 List of longest-running Philippine television series
 List of longest-running Spanish television series
 List of longest-running UK television programmes
Lists of longest-running U.S. shows by broadcast type:
 List of longest-running U.S. broadcast network television series
 List of longest-running U.S. cable television series
 List of longest-running U.S. first-run syndicated television series
 List of longest-running U.S. primetime television series

References

Lists of radio programs
Lists of longest-duration things